George and Davis', George and Danver, and George and Delila, are three locations that comprise the ice cream chain G&D′s. The chain is located in Oxford, England.

History
G&D's was founded in 1992 by two Oxford students, George Stroup and Davis Roberts, who gave their names to the original café in Little Clarendon Street.

G&D's opened a second branch, George and Danver, on the corner of St. Aldates and Pembroke Street in 2001, which make a daily selection of baked goods. Both ice-cream and bakery items are cycled from shop to shop with "ice-cream bikes."

In 2007 a third shop, George and Delila, was opened on Cowley Road. It has become a venue for music events and informal concerts.

Controversy 
In January 2014, George and Davis was rated one out of five for food hygiene by the Food Standards Agency. According to the chain, they complied with all criteria and hope to achieve a five star rating in due time.

G&D's has been described by customers as "extortionately priced," though reviews overall tend to be favorable.

References

Further reading
 
 
 
 

Ice cream parlors
Shops in Oxford
Restaurants established in 1992